Sekolah Menengah Sains Muzaffar Syah (known by its acronym MOZAC) is the only science school and one of the two fully residential schools (Sekolah Berasrama Penuh) in the state of Malacca, Malaysia. It was established in 1973 under the Second Malaysia Plan as the first boarding school in the state. The school was built on the top of a hilly area in Ayer Keroh, at 121.9 meters above sea level and in an area encompassing 12.9 hectare. Its buildings were completed in 1976 and officiated in 1983 as Sekolah Menengah Sains Melaka, later renamed Sekolah Muzaffar Syah Melaka after the fourth Sultan of the Malacca Sultanate. In 2010, the school received the High Performance School award, the school is specialised in green technology, agriculture, robotics and electronics.

List of principals

School anthem 
Lyrics by Ustaz Hamdan Kamarudin. Song by S. Sudarmaji. Music arrangements by Mohd Hasifian Harun.

Facilities 

There are generally a total of 3 building blocks that house MOZAC students. 2 of them are combined blocks that house male students while a separate block houses female students. Asrama puteri (Aspuri) and Asrama putera (Aspura) are separated by Dewan Sultan Megat Iskandar Syah which is the dining hall of this school.

The new Surau Al-Abrar which was completed in 2016 replaces the old Surau Al-Abrar. The construction of this surau took 2 years. This Surau was designed with open-concept because MOZAC's high position has already made ventilation in the surau a matter that does not need to be given attention. The management of this surau is placed entirely on the Body of Da'wah and Islamic Spirituality (BADRI). They are responsible for managing cleanliness and supervising programs such as the recitation of Surah Al-Kahfi on Fridays.

In 2021, the front road of the school has been collapsed until 2023.

Extracurricular activities 
The sports that are popular in MOZAC are rugby (MOZAC DRAGON), basketball (MOZAC KNIGHTS), softball, volleyball (MOZAC SPIKERS), netball (MOZAC TITANIUM), and football. Others sports played by the students include hockey [ (MOHOC)], sepak takraw, and badminton. The uniformed bodies are the all-boys Persatuan Kadet Bersatu Malaysia (PKBM), all-girls Persatuan Puteri Islam (PPI), Kadet Remaja Sekolah Malaysia (KRS), Air Scouts, Kadet Pertahanan Awam Malaysia (KPA), Malaysian Red Crescent Society (PBSM) and Wind Orchestra (WO).

The niche area of MOZAC is Research and Development (R&D). Earlier, when it was awarded the Cluster School status, there were three niche areas: k-teroka (R & D), e-MOZAC (ICT) and e-Tinta (Writing). The three were combined into the single R&D in 2012. In recent years, MOZAC has been known for pioneering other schools in this area. In 2009, the school produced its own thumb drive known as i-MOZAC (not to be confused with Apple's products). The lights in the school fully uses LED that are assembled by the students. In addition, it is also known for its robotics and F1 in Schools programmed. Recently, the school started to do research involving the potential of green technology.

The school WO team made it to the Wind Orchestra Finale in 2002 and 2003. The best conductor award was given to the school in 2002 and was the fourth out of eight teams in 2003.

Notable alumni 
 Idris Haron – 10th Chief Minister of Malacca,  
 Datuk Wira Dr. Mohamed Farid bin Md Rafik - Former Deputy Minister in the Prime Minister's Department (National Unity and Social Wellbeing), former MP of Tanjung Piai.

References

External links 

 
 Official Facebook page

Educational institutions established in 1973
1973 establishments in Malaysia
Co-educational boarding schools